Following are the statistics of the Libyan Premier League for the 1988–89 season.  The Libyan Premier League is the highest division of Libyan football championship, organised by Libyan Football Federation.  It was founded in 1963 and features mostly professional players.

Overview
Al-Ittihad (Tripoli) won the championship.

References
Libya - List of final tables (RSSSF)

Libyan Premier League seasons
1
Libya